Grace Lenczyk Cronin (September 12, 1927 – December 13, 2013) was an American amateur golfer who won the 1947 All American Open. During her career, Lenczyk was the winner of the Canadian Women's Amateur from 1947 to 1948 and the U.S. Women's Amateur in 1948. In team events, she was a member of the winning American team at the 1948 and 1950 Curtis Cup. Lenczyk was inducted into the Connecticut Golf Hall of Fame in 1969.

Early life and education
Lenczyk was born on September 12, 1927, in Newington, Connecticut. At the age of eleven, she started playing golf with her siblings at the Indian Hill Country Club in Newington, Connecticut. For her post-secondary education, Lenczyk went to Arnold College to study physical education.

Career
As an amateur golfer, Lenczyk competed at the U.S. Women's Amateur consecutively between 1946 and 1949 and was the 1948 championship winner. Outside of the United States, Lenczyk won the 1947 and 1948 Canadian Women's Amateur and appeared at the 1948 and 1949 British Ladies Amateur. Apart from her amateur competitions, Lenczyk had her first professional win at the 1947 All American Open. In major championships, she had a top eight finish at the 1948 Titleholders Championship and 1948 U.S. Women's Open. In team events, she was a member of the American team that won the 1948 and 1950 Curtis Cup.

Awards and honors
Lenczyk was inducted into the Connecticut Golf Hall of Fame in 1969 and the Stetson University Hall of Fame in 1980. She has been honored by The Pebble Beach Company by having the 5th hole of the Tiger Woods designed course, The Hay, named "Grace" in recognition of her U.S. Women's Amateur win hosted by Pebble Beach in 1948, when she was 21.

Death
On December 13, 2013, Lenczyk died in Walpole, Massachusetts.

References

American female golfers
Amateur golfers
Winners of ladies' major amateur golf championships
1927 births
2013 deaths
21st-century American women